Altheak is a village in the Nicobar district of Andaman and Nicobar Islands, India. It is located in the Nancowry tehsil.

Demographics 

According to the 2011 census of India, Altheak has 8 households. The effective literacy rate (i.e. the literacy rate of population excluding children aged 6 and below) is 78.26%.

References 

Villages in Nancowry tehsil